Children's Ward (retitled The Ward from 1995 to 1998) is a British children's television drama series produced by Granada Television and broadcast on the ITV network as part of its Children's ITV strand on weekday afternoons. The programme was set – as the title suggests – in Ward B1, the children's ward of the fictitious South Park Hospital (known as Sparky's), and told the stories of the young patients and the staff present there.

Aimed at older children and teenagers, Children's Ward was a long-lived series for a children's drama, starting life in 1988 as a contribution to the Dramarama anthology strand, "Blackbird Singing In The Dead of Night", then first broadcast as a series in 1989 and running from then until 2000.

Production history
The series was conceived by Granada staff writers Paul Abbott and Kay Mellor, both of whom went on to enjoy successful careers as award-winning writers of adult television drama. At the time, they were both working on the soap opera Coronation Street, and had recently collaborated on a script for Dramarama.

Abbott, who had been through a troubled childhood himself, had initially wanted to set the series in a children's care home rather than a hospital, but this was vetoed by Granada executives. During the course of its run, however, Children's Ward won many plaudits for covering difficult issues such as cancer, alcoholism, drug addiction and child abuse in a sensitive manner. The programme won many awards, including in 1997 a BAFTA Children's Award for Best Drama, won by an episode in which a serial killer lures children to him via the internet and is – highly unusually for children's television – not eventually caught.

Welsh television producer Russell T Davies was the show's producer, and writer of several episodes, from 1992 to 1995.

The decision to end Children's Ward came in mid-2000, after transmission of the final series, and ironically came as the sole original cast member Rita May – who played Auxiliary Nurse Mags – said she had no plans to leave the show.

On 5 and 6 January 2013, the show was repeated as part of CITV's Old Skool Weekend, which celebrated thirty years of the children's strand. This was also the first time the programme was seen on the CITV Channel.

Filming location
Filmed at Bolton General Hospital (now the Royal Bolton Hospital), in Bolton, Greater Manchester. Some exterior shots (such as the exterior entrance to the children's hospital) were filmed outside the now demolished Maternity Hospital entrance at the former Withington Hospital, South Manchester.

30 Years of CITV, which aired on ITV1 on 29 December 2012, revealed that interior sets for the hospital were filmed next door to some of the Coronation Street interiors.

Characters
These are the original main characters from the first three series. Some lasted several years and appeared in subsequent series.

Jane Worthington (patient)
Actors to go on to other theatre and television work include Chris Bisson, Tina O'Brien, Samia Ghadie, Adele Silva, Alan Halsall, Stephen Graham, Steven Arnold, Danny Dyer, Jeff Hordley, Nikki Sanderson, Andrew Lee Potts, Vicky Binns, Ralf Little, Anthony Lewis, Tim Vincent, Kieran O'Brien, Ben Sowden, William Ash, Maxine Peake and Jane Danson.

Tie-in publications

Novelisations

Script book
 Exact title unknown, possibly Children's Ward. Edited by Lawrence Till (contains selected scripts from the series by Paul Abbott, Kay Mellor and John Chambers), published by Heinemann Plays/Oxford in 1992.

DVD releases
Unlike many UK shows, Children's Ward has not been available in other English-speaking countries such as Australia or the U.S.A. prior to the U.K.. In May 2011, a U.K. DVD release was announced for release in July 2011 for the first series from Network DVD. Series 2 followed in October 2011, and Series 3 in January 2012. Series 4 was originally scheduled June 2013, but as yet has not been released.

See also
 CITV
 Grange Hill
 Byker Grove
 Press Gang

References

External links

 

1989 British television series debuts
2000 British television series endings
1980s British children's television series
1990s British children's television series
2000s British children's television series
1980s British medical television series
1990s British medical television series
2000s British medical television series
ITV children's television shows
Television series by ITV Studios
Television shows set in Manchester
1980s teen drama television series
1990s teen drama television series
2000s teen drama television series
English-language television shows
ITV television dramas
Television series about children
Television series about teenagers
Television shows adapted into novels
Television shows produced by Granada Television